Shahidullah Khan Bangladesh Nationalist Party politician. He was elected a member of parliament from Kushtia-4 in February 1996.

Career 
Khan was elected to parliament from Kushtia-4 as a Bangladesh Nationalist Party candidate in 15 February 1996 Bangladeshi general election.

References 

Living people
Year of birth missing (living people)
Possibly living people
People from Kushtia District
Bangladesh Nationalist Party politicians
6th Jatiya Sangsad members